The Big Salmon River is a small river in southern New Brunswick, Canada, that flows south into the Bay of Fundy.  The river has its source to the southwest of Sussex, New Brunswick.  The river flows into the Bay of Fundy near St. Martins, New Brunswick, and serves as the endpoint of the Fundy Trail.

See also
List of rivers of New Brunswick

External links
Fundy Trail Parkway

Rivers of New Brunswick